Nam Naadu may refer to:

 Nam Naadu (1969 film), a Tamil-language film starring M. G. Ramachandran
 Nam Naadu (2007 film), a Tamil-language film starring R. Sarathkumar